Settimio Simonini (8 July 1913 – 14 June 1986) was an Italian racing cyclist. He rode in the 1937 Tour de France. He also won the Giro dell'Appennino in 1936 and 1948, and finished in the top 10 overall in the Giro d'Italia three times.

Major results

1936
 1st Giro dell'Appennino
 3rd Piccolo Giro di Lombardia
 7th Giro di Lombardia
1938
 4th Overall Giro d'Italia
1939
 5th Overall Giro d'Italia
 8th Overall Tour de Suisse
1940
 10th Overall Giro d'Italia
1947
 4th Giro dell'Appennino
1948
 1st Giro dell'Appennino
 3rd Giro dell'Emilia
 10th Giro di Lombardia
1949
 3rd Overall Tour de Romandie
 6th Overall Volta a Catalunya
1950
 9th Milan–San Remo

References

External links
 

1913 births
1986 deaths
Italian male cyclists
Place of birth missing
Sportspeople from the Province of Massa-Carrara
Cyclists from Tuscany
People from Mulazzo